George Wishart of Drymme was a Scottish landowner, lawyer, and a financial administrator for Mary, Queen of Scots.

Family background 
George Wishart was kinsman of John Wishart of Pitarrow. His lands were at "Drynne", "Drymmie" or Drymme, also known as "Drum", in Maryton parish near Montrose in Angus, Scotland. A different property called Drymme or Drum was located nearby at Stracathro, close to the confluence of the North Esk and the Cruik Water, and this has sometimes been identified as the home of Wisharts.

Sub-collector of the Thirds of Benefices 
In March 1562 John Wishart of Pitarrow became the comptroller of the exchequer and "collector-general of teinds", the collector of the tax for church incomes calculated on the value of farms and incomes. John Wishart gave his kinsman George Wishart a job as a sub-collector of these royal incomes. An account made by George Wishart of his income (charge) and the expenditure (discharge) in 1564/5 is held by the National Records of Scotland. From the teinds, the "thirds of benefices", contributed to the expenses of the household of Mary, Queen of Scots.

Another member of the family, John Wishart's older brother, Alexander Wishart of Cairnbeg in Fordoun, was involved as collector of the thirds of Coupar Angus Abbey, and chamberlain of Badenoch. George Wishart collected a few payments from neighbours, including Walter Wood of Balbegno north of Brechin for lands at Fettercairn, and from Ninian Guthrie of Kingennie near Dundee, as Sheriff of Angus.

Some of the material in Wishart's account, especially regarding payments for the Royal Guard, Captain Anstruther, and the fortress island of Inchkeith, appears in other manuscript accounts and has been published.

The historian Gordon Donaldson highlighted payments by Wishart to household officers, including David Rizzio, who appears as "David Rischo, Italiane", and payments to the Kirk minister John Knox, as part of his stipend and also sums of money given to two of his servants, Margaret Fowlis and John Reid. Another payment for Knox was given to Robert Watson, a merchant in Edinburgh.

John Wishart of Pitarrow supported the Earl of Moray during the Chaseabout Raid and lost his job. No more is heard of George Wishart at the exchequer. The date of his death is unknown.

Marriage and children
Something is known of George Wishart's family. He married Elizabeth Guthrie (d. 1583), the widow of James Mylne of Dundee. She was a grandmother of a more well-known Dundee merchant David Wedderburn. Their daughter Eufame Wishart married Archibald Campbell of Clavers. Elizabeth Guthrie's will mentions the farmstock at Drymme with the plough oxen, work horses, and the sheep they grazed beside the Montrose Basin.

His son, also George Wishart, succeeded him as Laird of Drynnie or Drymme, before June 1605. He married Elizabeth Erskine, a daughter of Robert Erskine (d. 1590) from the nearby House of Dun, and a granddaughter of the Reformer, John Erskine of Dun. In 1609 George Wishart of Drymme and his son George, the feuar of Drymme, owed 2000 merks to a London-based tailor, Andrew Balfour.

External links 
 George Wishart of Drymme account draft transcript

References

16th-century Scottish people
Court of Mary, Queen of Scots
People from Montrose, Angus
Monarchy and money
Scottish exchequer